Dama y obrero (English: Lady and Worker) is a Chilean telenovela produced and broadcast by Televisión Nacional de Chile. It premiered on June 11, 2012 on TVN and June 12 on TV Chile.

Cast
 María Gracia Omegna as Ignacia Villavicencio
 Francisco Pérez-Bannen as Julio Ulloa
 César Sepúlveda as Tomás Ahumada
 Elisa Zulueta as Mireya Ledesma
 Magdalena Max-Neef as Engracia Hurtado
 Delfina Guzmán as Alfonsina Cardemil
 Edgardo Bruna as Mariano Villavicencio
 Josefina Velasco as Gina Ulloa
 Carmen Disa Gutiérrez as Margarita Ulloa
 Gabriel Prieto as Olegario Ledesma
 Emilio Edwards as Christopher "Neto" Lara
 Santiago Tupper as José Manuel Ortúzar
 Nicolás Oyarzún as Rubén Villavicencio
 Silvana Salgueiro as Irene Ulloa
 Daniela Palavecino as Trinidad Santada

Special participations
 Erto Pantoja as Ramón Molina
 Francisca Hurtado as Olga "Olguita"
 Claudia Hidalgo as Cecilia Flores

Versions
 An American remake of this telenovela produced by Telemundo and it stars Ana Layevska, José Luis Reséndez and Fabián Ríos.

See also
 Televisión Nacional de Chile

References

External links
 Official website 

2012 telenovelas
Chilean telenovelas
2012 Chilean television series debuts
2013 Chilean television series endings
Spanish-language telenovelas
Televisión Nacional de Chile telenovelas
Television shows set in Santiago